Blood and Fog is an original novel based on the US television series Buffy the Vampire Slayer.

Plot summary

Spike and the current Slayer of 1888 form an alliance to battle Jack the Ripper, a prostitute-murdering madman. It is learned Jack is not at all human. The alliance fails and Jack survives to come to Sunnydale in the modern day. He has plans, and using a mystical fog, he desires to kill more of the human race, which he hates.

Soon, the fog does arise, which is used as cover as a demon army rampages through the streets of Sunnydale. The threat is neutralized; unfortunately there are heavy citizen casualties.

Continuity

Supposed to be set in early season 6 of Buffy whilst Anya and Xander are engaged. Flashbacks to England 1888.

Canonical issues

Buffy books such as this one are not usually considered by fans as canonical. Some fans consider them stories from the imaginations of authors and artists, while other fans consider them as taking place in an alternative fictional reality. However unlike fan fiction, overviews summarising their story, written early in the writing process, were 'approved' by both Fox and Joss Whedon (or his office), and the books were therefore later published as officially Buffy/Angel merchandise.

External links

Reviews
Litefoot1969.bravepages.com - Review of this book by Litefoot
Teen-books.com - Reviews of this book
Nika-summers.com - Review of this book by Nika Summers

2003 novels
Books based on Buffy the Vampire Slayer
Novels about Jack the Ripper